Ark All Saints Academy is a mixed, non-selective school for pupils which opened as an Ark school in September 2013 with an intake of 120 year 7 students. The school grew year on year until its maximum capacity of 600 was reached in 2017. A sixth form was planned to open in 2018, with an intake of 120 in each year, however due to lack of funding the project was abandoned.

The school opened on the old grounds of St Michael and All Angels Academy in Camberwell, with a brand new building opening in January 2014.

The school's aim is for 'every scholar to have the means to go to university or pursue the career of their choice at the end of their compulsory education'.

Ark All Saints is graded as a 'Good' school after OFSTED inspections in 2015 and 2018. Ark All Saints Academy had its first SIAMS inspection in November 2016 and achieved an Outstanding grade in every category. Since 2017 it has been oversubscribed and at capacity.

Notes and references

External links
 Ark schools
 Ark on the Charity Commission website.

Academies in the London Borough of Southwark
Secondary schools in the London Borough of Southwark
Ark schools
Church of England secondary schools in the Diocese of Southwark
Educational institutions established in 2013
2013 establishments in England